Mojtaba Akbari (born 10 June 1984 in Tehran) is an Iranian jiujitsu athlete. He won the gold medal at the World Combat Games 2013 in Russia and the silver medal at the 2011 Ju-Jitsu World Championships in Cali, Colombia.
He won the 3rd place at the 2012 Ju-Jitsu World Championships in Vienna, Austria and 2014 Ju-Jitsu World Championships 2014 in Paris, France.

References

External links 
Mojtaba Akbari on Instagram
Mojtaba Akbari on Facebook
[https://www.tasnimnews.com/fa/news/1398/08/01/2125902 

Living people
Iranian jujutsuka
1984 births
Sportspeople from Tehran